James Widdoes (born November 15, 1953, in Pittsburgh, Pennsylvania), sometimes billed as Jamie Widdoes, is an American actor and television director.

Early life
Widdoes graduated from The Loomis Chaffee School in Windsor, Connecticut, in 1972, and is a member of their Board of Trustees. He began his acting career during college, starring in a production of The New Amen Show at the Diners Playhouse in Lexington, Kentucky, in 1974. He next attended Skidmore College in 1972 and then transferred to New York University's Tisch School of Arts, graduating in 1976 with a Bachelor of Fine Arts degree. While in New York, he roomed with such soon-to-be famous actors as Michael O'Keefe from Caddyshack and The Great Santini. He then began performing on New York City stages in productions such as the 1977 Equity Library Theatre revival of Wonderful Town and the 1982 Broadway musical Is there life after high school? His role in this last production won him a Theatre World Award.

Career
Widdoes starred as senior student and fraternity president Robert Hoover alongside John Belushi in the 1978 film National Lampoon's Animal House as well as the 1979 TV series spin-off Delta House. He has guest starred in many TV series episodes since then, including Remington Steele, Night Court, Dave's World, and My Wife and Kids. Widdoes starred as the patriarch of the Pembroke family, Stan, in the 1984-1985 seasons of Charles in Charge. Additionally, he was a frequent panelist on various game shows, including The Match Game-Hollywood Squares Hour and Super Password.

Beginning in 1998, he produced and/or directed many episodes for various television series. Some of these included Just the Ten of Us, Empty Nest, Anything But Love, Harry and the Hendersons, Boston Common, Brother's Keeper, Reba, 8 Simple Rules (For Dating My Teenage Daughter), The King of Queens, 'Til Death, Mom, The Bill Engvall Show and Broke. He directed several episodes of Two and a Half Men during the show's first six seasons and began directing the series regularly beginning with season seven. He directed all but two episodes of the series' final six seasons. From April 2015 to May 2021, he directed 122 of the 170 episodes of Mom.

References

External links

1953 births
American television directors
Living people
Loomis Chaffee School alumni
Male actors from Pittsburgh
Skidmore College alumni
Television producers from Pennsylvania
Tisch School of the Arts alumni